Third Bridge or 3rd Bridge may refer to:

 3rd bridge, an extended playing technique or added preparation on electric guitars or any other string instrument
 Third Bridge (Portuguese: Terceira Ponte), the second tallest bridge in Brazil, officially named Darcy Castelo de Mendonça Bridge
 The Third Bridge over the Panama Canal, under construction as of 2018
 Yavuz Sultan Selim Bridge, the third bridge over the Bosphorus in Istanbul, opened to traffic in 2016